Thomas Aquinas Murphy (December 10, 1915 – January 18, 2006) was former CEO of General Motors during the 1970s.

Personal life 
Thomas Aquinas Murphy was born on December 10, 1915 in Hornell, New York. He attended Leo Catholic High School in Chicago, Illinois.

Murphy died in Boynton Beach, Florida on January 18, 2006. He is buried at Calvary Cemetery in Queens, New York. Murphy was married for 64 years to Catherine Rita Murphy; their union produced two daughters and a son.

Career 

Murphy began with GM as a clerk in the controller's office after graduating in 1938 from the University of Illinois with a B.S. in accountancy. During World War II, Murphy served in the Navy for three years before returning to work for GM. He moved up the ranks from controller's office, from finance executive:
 VP of car and truck operations 
 VP of GM 1972-1974

He retired from GM as chairman and chief executive in 1980. He continued serving on GM's Board of Directors from 1980 to 1988.

His time at GM was when the automaker was still global leader with a record of 9.55 million cars and trucks sold globally (1978). The impact of the oil embargo in the late 1970s hit GM hard, as well as new policy on safety and regulation. GM remained profitable in the 1980s until Japanese imports began to up the production and lowered costs. In 2005, GM sold 9.17 million vehicles, the first time since 1978.

He is credited with saying "General Motors is not in the business of making cars.  It is in the business of making money."

References

External links 
 Thomas Murphy, 90, Leader of G.M. in 1970's Prosperity, Dies, New York Times Online - January 19, 2006
 University of Illinois Alumni Association
 Obituary from The Palm Beach Post on Jan. 20, 2006 republished on legacy.com

1915 births
2006 deaths
American chief executives in the automobile industry
Gies College of Business alumni
General Motors former executives

20th-century American businesspeople
People from Hornell, New York